Barringtonia calyptrata is a species of mangrove belonging to the family Lecythidaceae. It is native to New Guinea and to northern Queensland.

Gallery

References

External links

calyptrata
Flora of Queensland
Flora of New Guinea
Plants described in 1875